Dame Janet Suzman,  (born 9 February 1939) is a South African-born British actress who enjoyed a successful early career in the Royal Shakespeare Company, later replaying many Shakespearean roles on TV. In her first film, Nicholas and Alexandra (1971), her performance as Empress Alexandra Feodorovna earned her several honours, including a nomination for the Academy Award for Best Actress.

Suzman later starred in a wide range of classical and modern drama as well as directing many productions, both in Britain and South Africa. Suzman appeared in A Dry White Season (1989), a film that examined apartheid.

Early life
Janet Suzman was born in Johannesburg to a Jewish family, the daughter of Betty (née Sonnenberg) and Saul Suzman, a wealthy tobacco importer.

Her grandfather, Max Sonnenberg, was a member of the South African parliament, and her aunt was the civil rights/anti-apartheid campaigner Helen Suzman. Suzman was educated at the independent school Kingsmead College, Johannesburg, and at the University of the Witwatersrand, where.

Stage career
After training for the stage at the London Academy of Music and Dramatic Art, Suzman made her debut as Liz in Billy Liar at the Tower Theatre, Ipswich, in 1962. She became a member of the Royal Shakespeare Company in 1963 and started her career there as Joan of Arc in The Wars of The Roses (1962–64). The RSC gave her the opportunity to play many of the Shakespearean heroines, including Rosaline in Love's Labour's Lost, Portia in The Merchant of Venice, Ophelia in Hamlet, Kate in  The Taming of the Shrew, Beatrice in Much Ado About Nothing, Celia and Rosalind in As You Like It, Lavinia in Titus Andronicus and her Cleopatra, magisterial, ardent and seductive, in 1973, which is said to have been a definitive performance. (An ATV/ITC television production, Antony and Cleopatra, was broadcast in 1974 in the UK and was shown internationally.) Although her stage appearances tended to run naturally towards Shakespeare and the classics, including Ibsen's Hedda Gabler, Chekhov's The Three Sisters, Marlowe, Racine, Gorky and Brecht, she also appeared in plays by Genet, Pinter, Ronald Harwood, Nicholson, Albee and others.

Films and television
She appeared in many British television drama productions in the 1960s and early 1970s, including Saint Joan (1968), The Three Sisters (1970), Macbeth (1970), Hedda Gabler (1972), Twelfth Night (1973), as Hilda Lessways in Clayhanger (1976), as Lady Mountbatten in Lord Mountbatten: The Last Viceroy (1985) and Dennis Potter's The Singing Detective (1986). Her first film role was in Nicholas and Alexandra (1972), and she was nominated for the Academy Award for Best Actress, the BAFTA and the Golden Globe for her portrayal of the Empress Alexandra. This was followed by A Day in the Death of Joe Egg (1972) opposite Alan Bates. In addition to the 1974 television version of Shakespeare's Antony and Cleopatra, she also appeared as "Frosine" in the BBC's Theatre Night 1988 production of The Miser opposite Nigel Hawthorne as "Harpagon" and Jim Broadbent as Maitre Jacques. Another role was that of Frieda Lawrence in Priest of Love (1981).

Suzman has made few films since, the best-known being Don Siegel's The Black Windmill (1974), Nijinsky (1980), Peter Greenaway's The Draughtsman's Contract (1982), Federico Fellini's E la Nave Va (And the Ship Sails On 1983), A Dry White Season (1989) with Marlon Brando and Nuns on the Run (1990; a rare comedic role). In 2020 Suzman appeared in the Netflix production of The Crown as the literary agent of Michael Shea, the queen's press secretary. The episode dealt with the rift between Buckingham Palace and Margaret Thatcher over the prime minister's refusal to back Commonwealth sanctions against South Africa. The episode also inferred that Mrs Thatcher's stance might have been linked to her son Mark's business interests in South Africa.

Later activities
In her native South Africa she directed Othello, which was televised, and Brecht's The Good Woman of Setzuan (renamed The Good Woman of Sharpeville) both at the Market Theatre, Johannesburg.  She also toured her modern adaptation of Chekhov's The Cherry Orchard - a South African response entitled The Free State. She wrote, starred in and directed this piece with the Birmingham Repertory Theatre. Other productions with Suzman as director included A Dream of People at the RSC, The Cruel Grasp at the Edinburgh Festival, Feydeau's No Flies on Mr Hunter (Chelsea Centre, 1992), Death of a Salesman (Theatr Clwyd, 1993), and Pam Gems's The Snow Palace (Tour and Tricycle Theatre, 1998).

In 2002, she returned to the RSC to perform in a new version of The Hollow Crown with Sir Donald Sinden, Ian Richardson and Sir Derek Jacobi. In 2005, she appeared in the West End in a revival of Brian Clark's 1978 play Whose Life Is It Anyway? starring Kim Cattrall. In 2006 she directed Hamlet and in 2007 she played Volumnia in Coriolanus in Stratford-upon-Avon, for which she received excellent notices. In 2010, she appeared in Dream of the Dog, a new South African play, at the Finborough Theatre, London, which subsequently transferred to the West End. Suzman wrote Acting With Shakespeare: Three Comedies, a book based on a series of acting master classes. 

In 2014, Suzman was criticized for comments regarding arts participation in the theater. In response to a call by Meera Syal to engage in more diverse audiences, Suzman inaccurately referred to theater as "a white invention, a European invention."

Personal life and honours
Her marriage (1969–86) to director Trevor Nunn ended in divorce; they have one son.

Suzman was appointed Dame Commander of the Order of the British Empire (DBE) in the 2011 Birthday Honours for services to drama. 

Janet Suzman holds Honorary D.Litt. degrees from the Universities of Warwick, Leicester, London (QMW), Southampton, Middlesex, Kingston, Cape Town University Edge Hill University and Buckingham University. She is an Honorary Fellow of the Shakespeare Institute, and was awarded the Pragnell Award for lifetime services to Shakespeare in 2012.

She is a patron of the London International Festival of Theatre.

Filmography

Reference:

References

External links
 
 Janet Suzman at Who's Who Southern Africa

1939 births
Living people
Alumni of the London Academy of Music and Dramatic Art
British stage actresses
British film actresses
British television actresses
British film directors
Jewish British actresses
People from Johannesburg
Royal Shakespeare Company members
South African stage actresses
South African film actresses
South African television actresses
South African film directors
South African women film directors
South African Jews
Dames Commander of the Order of the British Empire
Actresses awarded damehoods
South African emigrants to the United Kingdom
South African people of Lithuanian-Jewish descent
British people of Lithuanian-Jewish descent
University of the Witwatersrand alumni